Black Roots may refer to:

Film 
 Black Roots (film), a 1970 film directed by Lionel Rogosin
 Racines noires (Black Roots), a 1985 film directed by Safi Faye

Music 
 Black Roots (band), British reggae band, also the name of the band's debut album
 Black Roots (album), a 1979 album by Sugar Minott
 Black Roots Records, record label operated by Sugar Minott

Literature 
  Black Roots (novel), a 1977 novel by Robert Tralins